The men's decathlon event at the 2015 Summer Universiade was held on 8 and 9 July.

Medalists

Results

100 metres
Wind:Heat 1:  0.0 m/s, Heat 2: +0.6 m/s, Heat 3: +1.0 m/s

Long jump

Shot put

High jump

400 metres

110 metres hurdles
Wind:Heat 1: -0.4 m/s, Heat 2: +0.8 m/s, Heat 3: +1.4 m/s

Discus throw

Pole vault

Javelin throw

1500 metres

Final standings

References

Decathlon
2015